In mathematics, specifically in functional and complex analysis, the disk algebra A(D) (also spelled disc algebra) is the set of holomorphic functions

ƒ : D → ,

(where D is the open unit disk in the complex plane ) that extend to a continuous function on the closure of D.  That is,

where  denotes the Banach space of bounded analytic functions on the unit disc D (i.e. a Hardy space).
When endowed with the pointwise addition (ƒ + g)(z)  ƒ(z) + g(z), and pointwise multiplication (ƒg)(z)  ƒ(z)g(z), this set becomes an algebra over C, since if ƒ and g belong to the disk algebra then so do ƒ + g and ƒg.

Given the uniform norm,

by construction it becomes a uniform algebra and a commutative Banach algebra.

By construction the disc algebra is a closed subalgebra of the Hardy space . In contrast to the stronger requirement that a continuous extension to the circle exists, it is a lemma of Fatou that a general element of H∞ can be radially extended to the circle almost everywhere.

References 

Functional analysis
Complex analysis
Banach algebras